Surberg is a municipality  in the district of Traunstein in Bavaria, Germany. It is 90 km (55.7 miles) southeast of the Bavarian capital of Munich.

Sights
 Catholic parish church St. Georg
 Surberg Inn

References